The George and Dragon was a pub at 2-4 Hackney Road, Shoreditch, East London.

In August 2015, the pub's closure was announced, due to a "dramatic" rent increase, and a campaign was launched for it to become an Asset of Community Value.

It was a well-known gay venue, and featured live arts projects in conjunction with the Institute of Contemporary Arts, and was known for "total fun and mindless hedonism".

References

LGBT pubs in London
Shoreditch
Saint George and the Dragon
Former pubs in London
Pubs in the London Borough of Hackney